Thanga Pappa is a 1993 Indian Tamil-language supernatural horror film directed by R. Aravindraj. The film stars Shamili, Ramki, M. N. Nambiar, Thalaivasal Vijay, Aishwarya and Sreeja, with Chandrasekhar, Keerikkadan Jose, Thyagu, Raviraj, Murali Kumar and Prabhakaran playing supporting roles. The film, produced by the film editor G. Jayachandran,  Deva and was released on 2 July 1993.

Plot

Ravi, his wife Gowri and their little daughter Abhirami move in an abandoned house. Ravi starts to work as an export manager in Ananthu and Swamy's company. Ravi is helped in his work by the police officer Rajasekhar, the customs officer Ameer, and Ananthu's son Balaji. That night, strange things happen in their house. Abhirami often meets the old man Adaikalam after the school in secret.

One day, Ameer, scared of something, accidentally falls off the ship and dies. The next day, Balaji is set on fire and dies from severe burns. Adaikalam then confesses to Gowri that Abhirami is in fact possessed by the spirit of his granddaughter Angela.

Four years ago, Adaikalam's son Assistant Commissioner of Police Lawrence got a transfer in a harbour city. He and his pregnant wife Thulasi moved to the city and eagerly waited for the birth of their baby. The scanning had revealed that the baby is a girl, so they named her Angela. From the very earliest days of his posting, Lawrence became well known by the local criminals. The smuggler Ananthu, his brother Swamy, and Balaji even threatened Lawrence and his wife, but Lawrence continued to seize Ananthu's illegal loads. Lawrence became friends with the Deputy Superintendent of Police Rajasekhar, his colleague. One night, Lawrence arrested Ananthu, Swamy, Balaji, and Ameer. They were all locked in the local police station. Rajasekhar released them and betrayed Lawrence's trust. Later that night, Lawrence was brutally killed and Thulasi was severely beaten up by the criminals in their house, resulting in abortion which left her mentally ill.

Ananthu, Swamy, and Rajasekhar also realise that Abhirami is possessed by the spirit. They are urged to kill the little girl. What transpires next forms the rest of the story.

Cast

Shamili as Abhirami
Ramki as Lawrence (guest appearance)
M. N. Nambiar as Adaikalam
Thalaivasal Vijay as Ravi
Aishwarya as Gowri
Sreeja as Thulasi
Chandrasekhar as Doctor Kurian
Keerikkadan Jose as Ananthu
Thyagu as Swamy
Raviraj as Rajasekhar
Murali Kumar as Ameer
Prabhakaran as Balaji
Veera Raghavan as Judge
Peeli Sivam as Lawyer
Krishnamoorthy as Lawyer
Dakshinamoorthy as Church father
Annadurai Kannadasan as Doctor

Soundtrack
The music was composed by Deva, with lyrics written by the director Aravindraj.

Reception 
Malini Mannath of The New Indian Express called it a "fairly watchable film", she praised Deva's background score and Shamili's acting. At the 14th Cinema Express Awards, Shamili won the Best Child Artist award.

References

External links 
 

1993 films
1990s Tamil-language films
1990s supernatural horror films
Indian supernatural horror films
Films scored by Deva (composer)
Films directed by R. Aravindraj